The Owl Creek Mountains are a subrange of the Rocky Mountains in central Wyoming in the United States, running east to west to form a bridge between the Absaroka Range to the northwest and the Bridger Mountains to the east. The range forms the boundary between the Bighorn Basin to the north and the Shoshone Basin to the south. The Wind River passes through the gap between the range and the Bridger Mountains to the east, and becomes the Bighorn River on the north side of the mountains. The range is entirely within the Wind River Indian Reservation.

See also
 List of mountain ranges in Wyoming

Notes

Mountain ranges of Wyoming
Landforms of Hot Springs County, Wyoming
Wind River Indian Reservation